Independent Media Corporation launched Geo Entertainment in October 2002. It is an entertainment channel in Pakistan which airs Lollywood movies and TV dramas. 

A number of popular programs from GEO became available on Amazon Prime Video in late 2019; such as Aapki Kaneez, Yaar-e-Bewafa, Khuda Aur Mohabbat, and more. In addition, the drama serial Khaani is also available for streaming on Netflix.

The following is a list of programming currently being broadcast, and formerly broadcast, on Geo TV, a television channel in Pakistan. It airs dramas throughout the day, with reruns of popular ended serials airing in the morning and nighttime.

Current programming

Original Programming

Farq
Qalandar
Grift
Tere Bin
Nikah

Upcoming Broadcast
Sanwal Yaar Piya
Jannat Se Aagey

Former programming 
This is a list of original programming first broadcast by Geo TV.

Anthology
 Aik Aur Munafiq
Ain
Dikhawa
Libaas
Maamlaat
Makafaat
Nisa
Talluq
Zindagi Udaas Hai Tu

Comedy/Sitcom

Baraat Series
Azar Ki Ayegi Baraat
Dolly Ki Ayegi Baraat
Takkay Ki Ayegi Baraat
Annie Ki Ayegi Baraat
 Chaudhry and Sons
Dolly Aunty Ka Dream Villa
 Dolly Darling
Hum Sab Umeed Se Hain
Ishq Jalebi
Jalebiyan
 Khala Surraya
Kis Din Mera Viyah Howay Ga
Ladies Park
Main Mummy Aur Woh
Mannchali 
Miss Fire
Nadaaniyaan
 Paanch Saaliyan
Romeo Weds Heer
 Shahrukh Ki Saliyaan
Shashlik Xtra Hot
S.H.E
Shokhiyaan
Sitara Jahan Ki Betiyaan
Ulta Seedha
Zamani Manzil Kay Maskharay

Drama
 
Aao Laut Chalein
Aadha Din Aur Poori Raat
Aap ki Kaneez
Aasmanon Pay Likha
Ab Dekh Khuda Kya Karta Hai
Adhoora Bandhan
Adhoori Aurat 
Aik Nayee Cinderella 
Aik Thi Raniya
 Alif
Ali Ki Ammi 
Amma Aur Gulnaz  
Ana (2004) 
Anaya Tumhari Hui 
Ashk 
Aye Musht-E-Khaak
Baba Jani 
Badzaat
Bandhay Aik Dor Say
Bashar Momin 
Bedardi Saiyaan 
Behkawa 
Bewafai Tumhare Naam
Bholi Bano 
Bikhra Mera Naseeb 
Bojh 
Bol Meri Machli 
Chaand Parosa
Chain Aye Na
Chemistry
Choraha
Daraar
Darr Khuda Say  
Deemak 
Deewangi
Dekho Chaand Aaya 
Dhaani 
Dilfareb
Dil-e-Gumshuda
Dil-e-Momin
Dil-e-Nadan
Dil Awaiz
Dil Hai Chota Sa
Dil Ishq
Dil Kiya Karay
Dil Muhallay Ki Haveli
 Dil Tou Bhatkay Ga
Do Qadam Door Thay
Doraha
Dour 
Duaa
Ek Hatheli Pe Hina Ek Hatheli Pe Lahoo
Ek Kasak Reh Gayi
Ek Nazar Meri Taraf
Fitoor
Ghaao
Ghar Titli Ka Par
 Haasil 
Hari Hari Churiyaan
Hazaroon Saal
Heer
Hiddat
Hina Ki Khushboo
Hum Tum 
Iqraar
Ishqaaway 
Ishq Aatish
Ishq Ibadat
Ishq Ki Inteha 
Iss Khamoshi Ka Matlab 
Izn-e-Rukhsat 
Jahez
Jal Pari
Jannat Se Nikali Hui Aurat
JhoomJo Bichar GayeJo Chale To Jaan Se Guzar Gaye Joru Ka Ghulam JudaaiKaanch Ki Guriya Kabhi Socha Na ThaKahan Tum Chalay Gye Kahin Deep JaleyKaif-e-BaharanKaise Huaye BenaamKaise KahoonKalmoohi Kam ZarfKasa-e-DilKhaali HaathKhaaniKhalishKhanKhuda Aur MuhabbatKhuda Aur Muhabbat (season 1)Khuda Aur Muhabbat (season 2)Khuda Aur Muhabbat (season 3)KinaraKuch Dil Ne KahaKuch Kami Si HaiLadoon Mein PaliLaut Ke Chalay AanaMahnoorMain AkeliMajazi KhudaMakanMalika-e-AliyaMalkinMannat ManchahiMan JaliMann Ke MotiMantoMaryamMarzi 
 Meharposh Meray Dost Meray YaarMeray HumnasheenMera Khuda JaneMera Kya Qasoor ThaMera Rab WarisMera Yahan Koi Nahi Mere CharagarMere Khwabon Ka DiyaMere MohsinMeri Behan Maya Meri DulariMeri Zaat Zarra-e-Benishan Meri Zindagi Hai TuMirat-ul-UroosMi RaqsamMohabbat Chor Di MaineMohabbat Daagh Ki SuratMohabbat Na Kariyo Mohabbat Tumse Nafrat HaiMora PiyaMor MahalMujhe Kuch Kehna Hai MuqaddarNanhiNeelamNoor-e-ZindagiNoor BibiNoor Jahan NummPak VillaPartition Aik SafarPiya Mann Bhaye Piya Naam Ka Diya (2007)QaidQayamatRaaz e UlfatRamz-e-IshqRanjish Hi SahiRaniRasam Rukhsaar RukhsatiRuswaRu Baru Ishq ThaSaari Bhool Hamari ThiSaas Bahu Saat Pardon Mein Sabz Pari Laal KabootarSaltanat-e-DilSandalSatrangi Shaam DhaleyShaddan ShayadSilsilay Tera Mera Rishta 
 Tere Bina 
 Teri BehisiTeri BerukhiTeri Ek NazarTeri Meri Jodi Thoda Sa Aasman Thori Si Wafa ChahiyeTishnagi Dil KiTohmatTum Ho Ke Chup Tum Se Hi Talluq HaiTumhe Kuch Yaad Hai JaanaUff Yeh MohabbatUmm-e-HaniyaUmrao Jaan Ada Uraan (2010) 
 Uraan (2020)VaneeWafa Yaar-E-BewafaYaariyanYariyan Yeh Chahatein Yeh Shiddatein ZakhamZip Bus Chup Raho Zeenat Bint-e-Sakina Hazir HoZoya Sawleha 

Horror/supernatural
 Saaya (season 1) Saaya (season 2)Taar-e-AnkabootSoap/Long FormatAashnaAasman Choonay DoAye Dil Tu BataBabul Ka AngnaBaanjhBanjarBano Bazar  BannoBari BahuBechari MehrunnisaBechari Qudsia Beti JaisiBe RehemBharosa Pyar TeraBuri Aurat Chahat Hui Tere Naam Choti Choti Choti KhushiyaanDil Zaar ZaarDiya Jalaye Rakhna FasiqFitratGhutanGudduInaam-e-MohabbatInteqamKaash Main Teri Beti Na Hoti Kahe Ko Biyahi BadaisKajalKhoob SeeratKya Meri Shaadi Shahrukh Se HogiMaasi Aur MalkaMaikay Ki Yaad Na Aaye Maikey Ko Dedo Sandes Main Agar Chup HoonManjdhaar Mehndi Walay HaathMera Dard Bayzuban Mera Ghar Aur GhardaariMera HaqMere Armaan Meri Adhoori Mohabbat Meri Maa Meri Saheli Meri Bhabi Meri Subha Ka Sitara Mil Ke Bhi Hum Na Mile MohlatMujhe Khuda Pay Yaqeen HaiMunafiqMushkilMubarak Ho Rishta Aaya HaiNaik ParveenParasPiya Naam Ka DiyaRang MahalRishton Ki Dor Roshni Saare Mausam Apne HainSada Sukhi RahoSaibaanSangdil Sasural Meri Behen Ka SaweraSeeratSila Aur Jannat SiyaniSultana Kunji WaaliTamannaTanveer Fatima (B.A) Tere Pehlu MainTootay Huway PerTum Kahan Hum KahanUmeedVirasatYeh Kaisi Mohabbat HaiYeh Zindagi HaiZindagi Aik PaheliReality/Non-scripted4 Man ShowAsia's Singing SuperstarBanana News NetworkFoodistanGiye Gi Duniya Geet MereGeo Khelo PakistanGeorge Ka PakistanInaam GharInaam Ghar PlusJanay Kahan Gaye Woh DinKaun Banega Meera PatiPakistan Idol Sur KshetraThe Price Is RightYeh Ghar Aap Ka HuaMiniseriesSada SuhaganSayyoni Mera MahiTelefilms
 1 Dulhan 2 BaraatiAbhi Tou Main Jawaan HounAinaAitebaarAnjumanArmaanBaal Baal Bach GayeBattamiz DilBitiya Hamaray Zamanay MeinChalo Chalo Dubai ChaloChappar Phaar KayChabukDaadi Ka DamadDabbang 2 Ka 2Desi GirlsDevar BhabhiDil Mera Dharkan TeriDino Ki DulhaniyaDil Tera HogayaDulha Bana BakraFootpathFilmy SiyapaaHona Tha PyaarHoney Vs MoneyHuay Hum Jin Kay Liye BarbaadHum Chale AayeIshqJimmy BondKarakti BijliyaanLaalLove SiyappaLove Life Ka LawLo Pakaray GayeMast MohabbatMain Bhi Tha TigerMain Ek Din Laut Kay AoungaMain Janoo Mera Khuda JaaneMehndi Laga Kay RakhnaMohay Bhool Gaye SawariyaNazar Kay SaamneNok JhonkPapa Kehte HainQissa Ek Gayee KaRok Do ShaadiRok Sako Tou Rok LoRomantic RaziaRuposhSanaullah Ki Dosri ShaadiShaadi Ka ChandShilai MaseenSitara Jahan Ki BetiyaanTere Pyaar MainTeri Meri KahaniTeri Meri Love StoryTujhse He RaabtaTu Mera ChaandZoya Nay Haan KardiZamani Manzil Kay MaskharayAwards showsLux Style AwardsStardust AwardsTarang Housefull AwardsTalk showsAalim OnlineBrunch With BushraGeo Subha Pakistan Good FoodJumma KareemNadia Khan ShowSubh e PakistanThe Sahir ShowThe Shareef ShowThe Shareef Show Mubarak HoThe Sportsman ShowUtho Jago PakistanUtho Geo PakistanRamazan special transmissionsAmaan RamazanPehchan RamazanRamazan ShareefPak RamazanDil Dil RamazanIttehad RamazanEhsaas RamazanAcquired programmingAlif Laila (Urdu dub of 1001 Nights)Bade Achhe Lagte Hain (Indian soap opera) Handy Manny (Urdu dub of Handy Manny)Kuruluş: OsmanMaria-Mummy Papa Ki Jaan (Mexican serial)Mickey Mouse Clubhouse (Urdu dub of Mickey Mouse Clubhouse)Na Tootay Rishta (Indian soap opera)Phineas and Ferb (Urdu dub of Phienas and Ferb)Noor (Turkish Romantic series)Qubool Hai (Indian soap opera)Sapne Suhane Ladakpan Ke (Indian soap opera)Tedi Sim Sim (Punjabi dub of The Simpsons)

Sponsored programming
These are the sponsored programs and shows which are broadcast as broadcast syndication.Always Girls CanAlways Karo YaqeenCoke StudioDettol WarriorsEasypaisa RaahiJazz National Song CompetitionKnorr Noodles Boriyat Buster Knorr Noodles Boriyat Buster 2LG One School One LibraryMiss Veet PakistanMiss Veet Pakistan 2National Ka Pakistan Nescafé BasementNestlé Fruta FunkaarNestlé Nido Young StarsPepsi Battle of the Bands  Veet Miss Super Model Veet Celebration of Beauty Sprite Spice Wars Telenor Ichamp Telenor Karo Mumkin ShowUth RecordsUth Records 2''

See also 
 List of programs broadcast by Hum TV
 List of programs broadcast by ARY Digital
List of Programs Broadcast by BOL Network

References

External links
Official website

Geo
 List
A&B Entertainment